On the Line is a 1984 film starring David Carradine.

It was also known as Rio Abajo.

Cast
David Carradine
Scott Wilson
Victoria Abril

Production
It was filmed over four years.

References

External links
On the Line at IMDb

1984 films